The 2015 CBA Playoffs was the postseason tournament of the Chinese Basketball Association's 2014-15 season.

Bracket
Teams in bold advanced to the next round. The numbers to the left of each team indicate the team's seeding, and the numbers to the right indicate the number of games the team won in that round. Teams with home court advantage are shown in italics.

First round
All times are in China standard time (UTC+8)

(1) Guangdong Southern Tigers vs. (8) Dongguan Leopards

(2) Liaoning Flying Leopards vs. (7) Zhejiang Lions

(3) Qingdao Eagles vs. (6) Shanxi Brave Dragons

(4) Beijing Ducks vs. (5) Jilin Northeast Tigers

Semifinals
All times are in China standard time (UTC+8)

(1) Guangdong Southern Tigers vs. (4) Beijing Ducks

(2) Liaoning Flying Leopards vs. (3) Qingdao Eagles

Finals
All times are in China standard time (UTC+8)

(2) Liaoning Flying Leopards vs. (4) Beijing Ducks

Chinese Basketball Association playoffs
playoffs